is a Japanese integrated beverages company. It is a subsidiary of Kirin Holdings Company, Limited.
Its major operating units include Kirin Brewery Company, Limited, Mercian Corporation and Kirin Beverages Company, Limited. Kirin is a member of the Mitsubishi Group.

History
The Japan Brewery Company, Limited, the forerunner of Kirin Brewery, was established in 1885, taking over the assets of the Spring Valley Brewery, first founded in Yokohama in 1869 by Norwegian-American brewer, William Copeland. In a deal brokered by Thomas Blake Glover, the Japan Brewery was incorporated in Hong Kong in the name of W.H. Talbot and E.H. Abbott with financial backing provided by a group of Japanese investors including Iwasaki Yanosuke, then-president of Mitsubishi.

The Japan Brewery first began marketing Kirin Beer in 1888.  The Kirin Brewery Company was established as a separate legal entity in February 1907, purchasing the assets of the Japan Brewery and expanding the business in an era of growing consumer demand.  Kirin Brewery built on the traditions of the Japan Brewery retaining the use of malted grains and hops imported from Germany and employing German brewers to oversee production. An exclusive partnership with Meidi-ya proved highly successful in the marketing of Kirin's beers both in Japan and overseas.

Corporate overview

Kirin Brewery sells two of the most popular beers in Japan: Kirin Lager, one of the country's oldest beer brands, brewed since 1888; and Ichiban Shibori. Within the happoshu (low-malt) category, Kirin Tanrei is the top seller. Kirin handles domestic distribution for several foreign brands, including Budweiser and Heineken.

Kirin's brewery operations also extend overseas, through strategic alliances, subsidiaries, and affiliates, to China, Taiwan, Australia, the Philippines, Europe, New Zealand and the United States. The company holds a 100% stake in Lion Nathan Limited, a consolidated subsidiary that is based in Australia but has particularly important operations in China. Kirin has a 48% stake in San Miguel Brewery, the dominant brewer in the Philippines. Kirin now applies its fermentation technology to areas such as plant genetics, pharmaceuticals, and bioengineering. Although brewing and related businesses remain the core of Kirin's activities, the company is also involved in several other sectors: hard liquor, wine, soft drinks, and food products.

In Japanese, "Kirin" can refer to giraffes, or to Qilin, the mythical hooved Chinese chimerical creatures in East Asian culture. Kirin Brewery is named after the latter.

In December 2006, the Kirin Brewery Company of Japan purchased a 25% stake in Hangzhou Qiandaohu Beer Co., Ltd.  for US$38 million.

On 14 July 2009, Kirin announced that it was in negotiations with Suntory on a merger. On 8 February 2010, it was announced that negotiations between the two had been terminated.

In early 2010 Kirin's Agribio business was sold to Dutch H2 Equity Partners; now it's part of Dümmen Orange.

In 2010, 23.4 percent of Kirin's sales were made overseas, the highest overseas revenue among all Japanese breweries.

In October 2011, the court decided that Kirin could buy a majority stake in family-run Brazilian beer Schincariol. Kirin bought a 50.45 percent stake in 2011, valued at $2.6 billion. In November 2011, Kirin Holdings Company agreed to buy out the remaining shareholders in Brazilian beermaker Schincariol Participacoes e Representacoes, completing its biggest acquisition as it sees growth in emerging markets ($1.35 billion was paid for the 49.54 percent stake, giving it control of all outstanding shares). In November 2012, Kirin changed Schincariol's name to Brasil Kirin.

In 2013 Kirin joined leading alcohol producers as part of a producers' commitments to reducing harmful drinking.

In February 2013, Charoen Sirivadhanabhakdi bought the 15% stake of Singapore's Fraser & Neave (F&N), a property-to-drinks conglomerate, from Kirin for US$1.6 billion.

In July 2014, Kirin announced its intention to revive the Spring Valley Brewery brand as a wholly owned subsidiary company to focus on producing and retailing microbrewery style beers produced using traditional ingredients and brewing methods.

On January 20, 2017, Heineken NV and Kirin Holdings confirmed they were in negotiations for Heineken to acquire Brasil Kirin.

On February 5, 2018, Kirin Holdings announced the acquisition of 95% outstanding shares in Kyowa Hakko Bio Co. Ltd, from Kyowa Hakko Kirin  to expand to wellness and bio-chemical products.

On August 6, 2019, Kirin Holdings announced it would take a 33% stake in cosmetics and dietary supplements company Fancl Corp for US$1.21 billion.

On June 30, 2022, Kirin Holdings announced sell its 51% stake in Myanmar Brewery Limited, its Myanmar joint venture to its military-linked local partner.

Holdings in Japan

Alcoholic beverage business
Kirin Distillery Company, Limited (Renamed from Kirin-Seagram Ltd. on July 1, 2002)
Ei Sho Gen Company, Limited
Kirin Communications Stage Company, Limited

Soft drink business
Kirin Beverage Company, Limited
Kinki Coca-Cola Bottling Company, Limited
Coca-Cola Beverages Northeast

Logistics
Kirin Logistics Company, Limited

Engineering
Kirin Techno-System Company, Limited
Kirin Engineering Company, Limited

Restaurants
Kirin Dining Company, Limited
Kirin City Company, Limited

Real estate
Kirin Building Management Company., Limited
Kirin Hotel Development Company, Limited

Other core businesses
Kirin Echo Company, Limited

Nutrient food
Kirin Well-Foods Company, Limited
Takeda-Kirin Foods Corporation
Cosmo Foods Company, Limited

Agribio
Kirin Green & Flower Company, Limited
Flower Gate, Inc.
Flower Season Company, Limited
Verdy Company, Limited
Tokita Seed Company, Limited
Japan Potato Corporation

Food
Nagano Tomato Company, Limited

Healthcare
Kyowa Hakko Kirin Company, Limited

Holdings outside Japan

Alcohol business
Asia Pacific Breweries (Singapore) (15%)
Brooklyn Brewery (United States) (24.5%)
Four Roses Distillery (United States)
Kirin Brewery of America LLC (United States)
Kirin Europe GmbH (Germany)
Lion Nathan Limited (Australia/New Zealand)
Mandalay Brewery Limited (Myanmar) 
Myanmar Brewery Limited (Myanmar) 
New Belgium Brewing Company (Pending Final Approval, United States)
Bells Brewing Company
San Miguel Brewery (Philippines) (48.3%)
Taiwan Kirin Company, Limited (Taiwan)
Zhuhai Kirin President Brewery Company, Limited (China)

Soft drink business
Coca-Cola Bottling Company of Northern New England (United States)

Pharmaceutical business
Kirin-Amgen, Inc. (United States)
Gemini Science, Inc. (United States)
Hematech Inc. (United States)
Jeil-Kirin Pharmaceutical, Inc. (South Korea)
Kirin Pharmaceuticals Company, Limited  (Taiwan)
Kirin Pharmaceuticals (Asia) Company, Limited (Hong Kong, China)
Kirin Kunpeng (China) Bio-Pharmaceutical Company, Limited (China)

Agribio business
Twyford International, Inc. (United States)
Kirin Agribio EC B.V. (Paris Office) (France)
Southern Glass House Produce, Limited (England)
Fides Holding B.V. (Netherlands)
Barberet & Blanc, S.A. (Spain)
Qingdao International Seeds Company, Limited (China)
Germicopa S.A. (France)
Kirin Agribio Shanghai Company, Limited (China)

Other business
Kirin Australia Pty., Limited (Australia)
Indústria Agrícola Tozan Ltda. (Brazil)

See also
 Beer in Japan
 Kirin Cup

References

External links

 
 
 Kirin 100th Anniversary Beers

Japanese companies established in 1885
Companies listed on the Tokyo Stock Exchange
Companies listed on the Osaka Exchange
Breweries in Japan
Mitsubishi companies
Companies formerly listed on the London Stock Exchange
Coca-Cola bottlers
 
Multinational companies headquartered in Japan
Food and drink companies established in 1885
Conglomerate companies based in Tokyo
Japanese brands
Holding companies based in Tokyo
Drink companies of Japan